Zsigmond Kelevitz (born 1 January 1954) is an Australian freestyle wrestler who competed at three Olympic Games and three Commonwealth Games.

Major championships 
He competed at the 1976 Montreal, 1980 Moscow and 1984 Los Angeles Olympics in the lightweight, or 68 kg division. His best result was fifth in 1984.

At the Commonwealth Games, he won Australia's first wrestling gold medal since 1954 when he won the lightweight division at the 1978 Edmonton Games and then won silver medals in the same weight division at the 1982 Brisbane and 1986 Edinburgh Games.

His first Olympic Games: Montreal 1976

World Championship 1979: 68 kg. Freestyle (6th)

Commonwealth Games 1982: 68 kg. Freestyle (2nd)

World Championship 1982: 68 kg. Freestyle (9th)

World Championship 1983: 68 kg. Freestyle (13th)

Commonwealth Games 1986: 68 kg. Freestyle (2nd)

Oceania Championship: 68 kg. Freestyle (1st).

References

External links
 Profile at Australian Olympic Committee

1954 births
Living people
Australian male sport wrestlers
Olympic wrestlers of Australia
Wrestlers at the 1976 Summer Olympics
Wrestlers at the 1980 Summer Olympics
Wrestlers at the 1984 Summer Olympics
Wrestlers at the 1978 Commonwealth Games
Wrestlers at the 1982 Commonwealth Games
Wrestlers at the 1986 Commonwealth Games
Commonwealth Games gold medallists for Australia
Commonwealth Games silver medallists for Australia
Hungarian emigrants to Australia
Commonwealth Games medallists in wrestling
Medallists at the 1978 Commonwealth Games
Medallists at the 1982 Commonwealth Games
Medallists at the 1986 Commonwealth Games